Elsloo is a village consisting of around 600 inhabitants in the municipality of Ooststellingwerf in the east of Friesland in the Netherlands.

The hamlets considered part of the village are Tronde and Canada.

History 
The village was first mentioned in 1002 as Elisla. The etymology is unclear. Elsloo developed as a road village. The monastery Lux Mundi used to be near Elsloo. It was destroyed in the 16th century, and its exact location is unknown. The Dutch Reformed church dates from 1913, and is a replacement of a 1632 predecessor. In 1987, a double belfry has been added to the church. In 1840, it was home to 239 people.

Gallery

References

External links

Website of Elsloo

Geography of Ooststellingwerf
Populated places in Friesland